Asifa may refer to:

Organisations 

 International Animated Film Association known also as ASIFA
 ASIFA-Hollywood, an American non-profit organization in Los Angeles, California, branch member of the "Association Internationale du Film d'Animation" or "ASIFA" (the International Animated Film Association)
Al-'Asifah, the mainstream armed wing of the Palestinian political party and militant group Fatah. Al-Asifah was jointly led by Yasser Arafat and Khalil Wazir

People 

 Asifa Bhutto Zardari (1953–2007), Pakistani politician who served as Prime Minister of Pakistan from 1988 to 1990 and again from 1993 to 1996.
 Asifa Bano, an 8-year-old girl abducted, raped, and murdered in what is known as Kathua rape case
Asifa Quraishi (aka Asifa Quraishi-Landes), American Professor of Law
Asifa Zamani, Indian scholar of Persian language

See also
Asifabad (disambiguation)